Judean Plain may refer to:

Judean Coastal Plain,  another name for the Central Coastal Plain, Israel
Shfela, a transitional hilly region between the Judean mountains and the coastal plain, Israel
Both of the above taken as a single geographical area